Urpo Vähäranta (15 June 1926 – 20 September 2011) was a Finnish middle-distance runner. He competed in the men's 1500 metres at the 1952 Summer Olympics.

References

External links

1926 births
2011 deaths
Athletes (track and field) at the 1952 Summer Olympics
Finnish male middle-distance runners
Olympic athletes of Finland